The AC75 (America's Cup 75) is a racing yacht used in the 2021 America's Cup match and planned to be used for the 37th America's Cup and 38th America's Cup matches. The  monohulls feature     
wing-like sailing hydrofoils mounted under the hull, a soft wingsail, and no keel.

The rule
Following the 2017 America's Cup, winners Royal New Zealand Yacht Squadron accepted a notice of challenge from Circolo della Vela Sicilia stipulating a monohull would be used in 2021. Conceptual graphics of a monohull with soft sails and topside canting hydrofoils were released on 21 November 2017, and the first draft of the class rule was published by the defender and the challenger of record on 29 March 2018. The return to monohulls with soft sails after three America's Cups on multihulls with wingsails is reminiscent of earlier America's Cup classes and seaworthy traditions, but the rule included hydrofoils to attract high performance crews and large TV audiences.

Under the protocol, each competing club could build two yachts, but two-boat testing was excluded except during the PRADA Christmas Cup on 17–20 December 2020, and for the defenders during the PRADA Cup 15 January – 22 February 2021. To reduce design and testing costs of the class unique class features, the rule specified foil controlling systems all manufactured by defender team and foil arms all manufactured by the Challenger of Record's builder Persico Marine.

List of AC75 yachts

The visible differences between designs have been commented by most of the yachtbuilding community and the specialized press as each of the boats were launched.

Speeds

Notable high speeds actually recorded in racing were:
  by Te Rehutai (in ) on 17 December 2020.
  by Britannia during day 4 of the Prada Cup 23 January 2021.
  by Patriot (American Magic) during day 1 of the Prada Cup Semifinals (in breeze gusting up to ) on 29 January 2021.

Controversy

Following the release of the canting hydrofoil design in 2017, Brazilian shipwright Manoel Chaves contacted ETNZ to inform them that he held a patent for the proposed design. Team New Zealand apparently ignored correspondence from Chaves' patent attorneys for over two years before simply dismissing the allegations. ETNZ defended themselves with the statement "every good idea has 1000 fathers".

See also
America's Cup yacht classes

References

External links
3D model of the AC75

America's Cup yachts
Box rule sailing classes
2021 America's Cup